Sirsiya Khalwatola  is a village development committee in Parsa District in the Narayani Zone of southern Nepal. At the time of the 1991 Nepal census it had a population of 3674 people living in 544 individual households.

References

Populated places in Parsa District